Mannaekhalli  is a small town in Bidar district in the southern state of Karnataka, India.It is 30km from Bidar district. It is located in the Chitguppa taluk of Bidar district in Karnataka.  

The Mannaekhelli village is  center of Marketing to the nearby villages. The village is situated on Hyderabad-Mumbai Highway (NH-65) and equidistant to the Bidar (District) in North, to the Zaheerabad (Taluk) in East, to the Humnabad (Taluk) in West, to the Chincholi (Taluk) in South.

Demographics
 India census, Mannaekhalli had a population of 9740 with 5049 males and 4691 females.

See also
 Bidar
 Districts of Karnataka

References

External links
 http://Bidar.nic.in/

Villages in Bidar district